Veľký Lapáš is a village and municipality in the Nitra District in western central Slovakia, in the Nitra Region.

History
In historical records the village was first mentioned in 1113.

Geography
The village lies at an altitude of 164 metres and covers an area of 8.158 km². It has a population of about 1175 people.

Ethnicity
The population is about 98% Slovak and 2% Magyar.

Twin towns — sister cities
Veľký Lapáš is twinned with:

  Piliscsaba, Hungary (2004)

References

External links
https://web.archive.org/web/20070513023228/http://www.statistics.sk/mosmis/eng/run.html
https://www.velkylapas.sk/

Villages and municipalities in Nitra District